The 2019 Nippon Professional Baseball (NPB) Draft was held on October 17, for the 55th time at the Grand Prince Hotel Takanawa to assign amateur baseball players to the NPB. It was arranged with the special cooperation of Taisho Pharmaceutical with official naming rights. The draft was officially called "The Professional Baseball Draft Meeting supported by Lipovitan D ". It has been sponsored by Taisho Pharmaceutical for the seventh consecutive year since 2013.

Summary 
Only the first round picks will be done by bid lottery. From 2015 to 2018, the second round of Waiver priority was given to the lowest team in the regular season of the league who the most wins in the Interleague play, but from 2019, the Professional Baseball Executive Committee has decided that the Central League and the Pacific League will be given waiver priority alternately every other year, and in 2019 Central League received the waiver priority.  From the third round the order was reversed continuing in the same fashion until all picks were exhausted.

First Round Contested Picks 

 Bolded teams indicate who won the right to negotiate contract following a lottery.
 In the first round, Masato Morishita (Pitcher) was selected by the Carp and Keito Mori (Infielder) by the Baystars without a bid lottery.
 In the second round, Junya Nishi (Pitcher) was selected by the Tigers , Hiroto Kobukata (Infielder)  by the Eagles, and Naoki Satoh (Outfielder) by the Hawks without a bid lottery.
 In the thrird round, Hiroya Miyagi (Pitcher) was selected by the Buffaloes, and Kenshin Hotta (Pitcher) by the Giants without a bid lottery.
 List of selected players.

Selected Players 

The order of the teams is the order of second round waiver priority.
 Bolded After that, a developmental player who contracted as a registered player under control.
 List of selected players.

Tokyo Yakult Swallows

Orix Buffaloes

Chunichi Dragons

Hokkaido Nippon-Ham Fighters

Hiroshima Toyo Carp

Chiba Lotte Marines

Hanshin Tigers

Tohoku Rakuten Golden Eagles

Yokohama DeNA Baystars

Fukuoka Softbank Hawks

Yomiuri Giants

Saitama Seibu Lions

References

External links 
 プロ野球ドラフト会議 supported by リポビタンD - NPB.jp Nippon Professional Baseball

Nippon Professional Baseball draft
Draft
Nippon Professional Baseball draft
Nippon Professional Baseball draft
Baseball in Japan
Sport in Tokyo
Events in Tokyo